A nocturnal is an instrument used to determine the local time based on the relative positions of two or more stars in the night sky. Sometimes called a horologium nocturnum (time instrument for night) or nocturlabe (in French and occasionally used by English writers), it is related to the astrolabe and sundial. Knowing the time is important in piloting for calculating tides and some nocturnals incorporate tide charts for important ports.

Even if the nightly course of the stars has been known since antiquity, mentions of a dedicated instrument for its measurement are not found before the Middle Ages. The earliest image presenting the use of a nocturnal is in a manuscript dated from the 12th century. Raymond Lull repeatedly described the use of a sphaera horarum noctis or astrolabium nocturnum.

With  Martín Cortés de Albacar's  book Arte de Navegar, published in 1551 the name and the instrument gained a larger popularity.

It was described also c. 1530 by Petrus Apianus in his Cosmographicus Liber, republished later by Gemma Frisius with a widely circulated illustration of the instrument while being used by an observer.

Construction

Nocturnals have been most commonly constructed of wood or brass.

A nocturnal will have an outer disc marked with the months of the year, and an inner disc marked with hours (and perhaps half hours, or quarter hours on the largest instruments) as well as locations for one or more reference stars. It will also have a pointer rotating on the same axis as the discs, sometimes extended beyond the rim. The axis, or pivot point, must be such that a star can be sighted through it; usually a hollow rivet is used. Since the instrument is used at night, markings may be exaggerated or raised. Often the inner disc has a diagram of the necessary constellations and stars, to aid in locating them.

Usage

A nocturnal is a simple analog computer, made of two or more dials, that will provide the local time based on the time of year and a sighting of Polaris, the North Star, and one or more other stars. In the northern hemisphere, all stars will appear to rotate about the North Star during the night, and their positions, like the progress of the sun, can be used to determine the time. The positions of the stars will change based on the time of year.

The most commonly used reference stars are the pointer stars from the Big Dipper (Ursa Major) or Kochab from the Little Dipper (Ursa Minor). The star Schedar in Cassiopeia may also be used, since it is on the opposite side of the sky from Ursa Major.

The inner disc is rotated so that the mark for the chosen reference star points to the current date on the outer disc. The north star is sighted through the center of the device, and the pointer arm is rotated to point at the chosen reference star. The intersection of the pointer arm with the hour markings on the inner disc indicates the time. The instrument must be held upright, and should have a handle or similar hint as to which direction is down.

It is not possible to convert the local time to a standard time such as UTC without accurate knowledge of the observer's longitude. Similarly, it is not possible to determine longitude unless the observer also knows the standard time from a chronometer.

See also
 List of astronomical instruments
 Sidereal time

References

External links
British Museum – Nocturnal from an astrological compendium
Simulation – Video and description, also, many devices
A working nocturnal in coin form

Navigational equipment
Astronomical instruments
Historical scientific instruments